Mare Chicose is a village in Mauritius which has been abandoned because of the smell of the nearby Mare Chicose Landfill site.

References

Populated places in Mauritius